Frederick George Turner (18 March 1914 – 12 September 2003) was a South African rugby union international who represented his country in 11 Tests. Sometimes his name is given as "Freddie" Turner.

Cricket career
Turner, a graduate of Grey High School, played three first-class cricket matches for Eastern Province in the 1931/32 Currie Cup season. After exactly ten years out of cricket, while he concentrated on rugby, he returned to the field in January 1942 and made his fourth and last first-class appearance, this time with Transvaal. His only wicket in these matches was Rhodesian Victor Robinson while he failed to impress with the bat.

Rugby union career
On 8 July 1933, Turner became the 232nd Springbok when he made his international debut, against  in Cape Town. Aged just 19 at the time, he was also the first South African rugby player to fly to a Test Match after being called up late. He later told friends and family that the biggest challenge that day was finding the airport in Port Elizabeth.

He went on to be capped a further ten times at Test level, including a tour of Australia and New Zealand in 1937. He made his last appearance against the British Isles in 1938 where he scored his fourth and final try. Used mainly on the wing but also at centre and fullback, Turner was handy at kicking goals and managed four conversions and three penalties in his career.

Test history 

Legend: try (3 pts); pen = penalty (3 pts.); conv = conversion (2 pts.), drop = drop kick (4 pts.).

See also
List of South Africa national rugby union players – Springbok no. 232

References

External links
Cricinfo: Frederick Turner
Springbok Rugby Hall of Fame

1914 births
2003 deaths
South African rugby union players
South Africa international rugby union players
South African cricketers
Eastern Province cricketers
Gauteng cricketers
Rugby union players from Port Elizabeth
Eastern Province Elephants players
Golden Lions players
Western Province (rugby union) players
Blue Bulls players
Alumni of Grey High School
Cricketers from Port Elizabeth
Rugby union wings